Maktab Rendah Sains MARA Gemencheh, commonly known as MRSM Gemencheh, is a secondary school in Tampin District, Negeri Sembilan, Malaysia. 

MRSM Gemencheh is  part of the Ulul Albab Programme.

References

External links

2007 establishments in Malaysia
Educational institutions established in 2007
Education in Negeri Sembilan